is a passenger railway station located in the city of Niihama, Ehime Prefecture, Japan. It is operated by JR Shikoku and has the station number "Y28".

Lines
Takihama Station is served by the JR Shikoku Yosan Line and is located 99.4 km from the beginning of the line at Takamatsu. Yosan line local, Rapid Sunport, and Nanpū Relay services stop at the station.

Layout
The station, which is unstaffed, consists of an island platform serving two tracks. The station building houses a waiting room and a shop. A footbridge leads to the island platform where there is an enclosed shelter for waiting passengers. There is a passing siding to the north of the island platform (between the station building and the island platform) and two dead-end sidings which branch off the main tracks.

Adjacent stations

History
At that time the station was operated by Japanese Government Railways, later becoming Japanese National Railways (JNR). With the privatization of JNR on 1 April 1987, control of the station passed to JR Shikoku.

Surrounding area
 Niihama City Hall Kawahigashi Branch
Niihama Municipal Kamisato Elementary School
Niihama Municipal Kawahigashi Junior High School

See also
 List of railway stations in Japan

References

External links
Station timetable

Railway stations in Ehime Prefecture
Railway stations in Japan opened in 1921
Niihama, Ehime